Arko may refer to:

People 
 Arkady Baghdasaryan (Arko) (born 1945), Armenian painter
 Arko Datta (born 1969), Indian photojournalist
 Ernest Papa Arko (born 1984), Ghanaian footballer
 Swinthin Maxwell Arko (1920-2006), Ghanaian politician 
 Arko Pravo Mukherjee, Indian composer, singer and songwriter

Other uses 
Arko, an Olympic-level show jumping horse ridden by Nick Skelton
 Arko, My Game, a book written by Ken Arthurson
 Arko (:tr:Arko), a brand of shaving and personal care products by the Turkish company Evyap

See also 
 Arco (disambiguation)